Gerald "Sonny" Brown (born April 20, 1936) is an American jazz drummer. 

After having played with Eddie “Cleanhead” Vinson, Amos Milburn, and Dinah Washington, Brown moved to New York in 1961, where he played with Frank Foster, Randy Weston, Ray Bryant, Kenny Burrell, Jon Hendricks (1963–4), Gildo Mahones (1964), Clifford Jordan, Curtis Fuller, Coleman Hawkins, Sonny Rollins, Zoot Sims, Lee Konitz, Archie Shepp, Sam Rivers, and Charles Mingus.

Having recorded for Roland Kirk in 1960, Brown went on to perform with Kirk's groups until 1976.

From 1968 Brown performed with the New York Bass Violin Choir, also writing an opera with its director, Bill Lee.

References

1936 births
Living people
American jazz drummers
American male drummers
20th-century American drummers
20th-century American male musicians
American male jazz musicians